A dudaryk is a Ukrainian duda player.

"Dudaryk", arrangement of folk song by Mykola Leontovych
"Dudaryk", tale by poet Pavlo Tychyna Kiev, 1950
Dudaryk (choir)
Dudaryky (ru/uk) film with Nataliya Sumska and Bohdan Stupka